Zujūnai is a village in Vilnius district municipality, Lithuania, it is located only about  east of Vilnius. According to the 2011 census, it had population of 1,660.

Demographics

According to the census of 2021, there were 7311 inhabitants in Zujūnai Eldership: 4,312 or 59% – Lithuanians, 2,133 or 29,2% – Poles, 464 or 6,3% – Russians, 88 or 1,2% – Belarusians, 43 – 0,6% Ukrainians and 272 or 3,7% – others.

References

Villages in Vilnius County
Vilnius District Municipality
Vilnius Voivodeship
Vilensky Uyezd
Wilno Voivodeship (1926–1939)